Syagrus is a genus of leaf beetles in the subfamily Eumolpinae. They are known from the mainland of Africa as well as Madagascar. They are often attracted by plants in the family Malvaceae; Syagrus rugifrons and Syagrus calcaratus are pests of cotton. The larvae of Syagrus calcaratus attack the roots of the plant and cause it to wilt.

According to Brian J. Selman (1965), Syagrus is probably restricted to the mainland of Africa. The Syagrus species described from Madagascar may actually belong to Pheloticus.

Species
Species of Syagrus include the following:

† described from Madagascar, may belong to Pheloticus

Species moved to Afroeurydemus:
 Syagrus apicicornis Lefèvre, 1891
 Syagrus atricollis Pic, 1940
 Syagrus atricolor Pic, 1940
 Syagrus brunneopunctatus Pic, 1941
 Syagrus cribricollis Pic, 1939
 Syagrus diversepunctatus Pic, 1940
 Syagrus holasi Pic, 1953
 Syagrus nigrosignatus Lefèvre, 1877
 Syagrus nodieri Pic, 1941
 Syagrus pallidicolor Pic, 1941
 Syagrus quadrimaculatus Pic, 1940: renamed to Afroeurydemus parvomaculatus Zoia, 2019
 Syagrus semicostatus Pic, 1940
 Syagrus signatus Pic, 1940
 Syagrus testaceicornis Pic, 1941

Species moved to Microsyagrus
 Syagrus discoidalis Pic, 1940
 Syagrus favareli Pic, 1938
 Syagrus madoni Pic, 1940
 Syagrus raffrayi Pic, 1940
 Syagrus recticollis Pic, 1949
 Syagrus testaceonotatus Pic, 1940
 Syagrus trinotatus Pic, 1939

Species moved to Paraivongius:
 Syagrus bicolorimembris Pic, 1940
 Syagrus bicoloripes Pic, 1939
 Syagrus disconotatus Pic, 1939
 Syagrus diversipennis Pic, 1940
 Syagrus gabonicus Pic, 1952
 Syagrus geniculatus Lefèvre, 1891
 Syagrus limbatus Lefèvre, 1891
 Syagrus obscuripes Pic, 1952
 Syagrus rufometallicus Pic, 1951
 Syagrus varicolor Lefèvre, 1891
 Syagrus viridicollis Pic, 1940

Species moved to Phascus:
 Syagrus chopardi Pic, 1950

References

Eumolpinae
Chrysomelidae genera
Beetles of Africa
Taxa named by Félicien Chapuis